Borgo Virgilio is a comune in the province of Mantua, in Lombardy, created with effect from 25 May 2014 from the merger of the former comuni of Borgoforte and Virgilio. 
A local referendum to approve the creation of this comune was held on 1 December 2013, when the outcome of voting across Borgoforte and Virgilio were 68% in favour and 32% against.

References

Cities and towns in Lombardy